Radoši is a small settlement east of Radovica in the Municipality of Metlika in the White Carniola area of southeastern Slovenia, right on the border with Croatia. The area is part of the traditional region of Lower Carniola and is now included in the Southeast Slovenia Statistical Region.

References

External links

Radoši on Geopedia

Populated places in the Municipality of Metlika